Alan Millar McKenna (born 4 August 1961), is a Scottish footballer who played as a forward in the Football League. He was born in Edinburgh.

References

External links

1961 births
Living people
Scottish footballers
Footballers from Edinburgh
Association football forwards
Berwick Rangers F.C. players
Craigroyston F.C. players
Falkirk F.C. players
Cowdenbeath F.C. players
Millwall F.C. players
Arbroath F.C. players
English Football League players
Tranent Juniors F.C. players